Tonda, (1958 – 23 March 2009), was the oldest orangutan in the United States.
Tonda died on March 23, 2009, at ZooWorld in Panama City Beach, Florida, aged 50.

Biography
Tonda, short for Tondaleyo, died in her sleep at the age of 50. Tonda had represented the oldest registered orangutan in captivity in the United States.

Cultural references
Tonda, along with a male kitten named T.K., had earned a modicum of fame after being named the second-best animal odd couple by Animal Planet.  The pair were also the subject of a book, Tonda and TK: Friends.

See also
 Ah Meng (c. 18 June 1960 — 8 February 2008) — female Sumatran orangutan and a tourism icon of Singapore
 Bonnie — orangutan; began whistling (mimicking an animal caretaker), which is changing ideas about primate sound repertoires.
 Chantek (born 1977) — orangutan; involved with language research and ApeNet language-using great ape ambassador
 List of apes
 Orangutans in popular culture
 Oldest apes

References

1959 animal births
2009 animal deaths
Individual orangutans
Individual primates in the United States